Royce Barry West (born September 26, 1952) 
is an American politician who serves as a member of the Texas Senate, representing the Dallas-based 23rd District.

Early life and education 

West was born in Annapolis, Maryland. He earned a Bachelor of Arts and Master of Arts in sociology from the University of Texas at Arlington. As an undergraduate, he was initiated into the Omega Psi Phi fraternity. West then earned a Juris Doctor from the University of Houston Law Center.

Career

Politics 
In 1986, West ran his first campaign for public office, losing his bid for Dallas County district attorney. His first successful political campaign was in 1992, when he ran for the Texas Senate, District 23 seat after the incumbent, Eddie Bernice Johnson, was elected to the U.S. House of Representatives. From April 2006 to January 2007, West served as president pro tempore of the Texas Senate.
On November 18, 2006, West was Governor for a Day, a ceremonial title that honors the service of the president pro tempore.

On July 22, 2019, West announced his candidacy for the United States Senate in the 2020 election for the seat held by John Cornyn. He finished second in the March 3 primary, but lost the July 14 runoff to MJ Hegar.

Legal career
In addition to serving in the Texas Senate, West is a managing partner at the law firm West & Associates L.L.P. Part of his practice involves providing bond counsel and other legal services for public entities such as Dallas Independent School District, the city of Dallas, and Dallas Area Rapid Transit. West's legal services have led to concerns over possible ethics violations in his Senate work due to a conflict of interest.

Electoral history

2018

2014

2012

2008

2004

2002

1998

1994

1992

References

External links

 Profile at the Texas Senate
 Royce West for Texas Senate
Project Vote Smart - Senator Royce West  (TX) profile
Follow the Money - Royce West 
2006 2004 2002 1998 campaign contributions

Archived Texas Senate Profile

|-

1952 births
21st-century American politicians
African-American people in Texas politics
Living people
Politicians from Dallas
Presidents pro tempore of the Texas Senate
Democratic Party Texas state senators
University of Texas at Arlington alumni
University of Houston Law Center alumni
Candidates in the 2020 United States Senate elections
21st-century African-American politicians
20th-century African-American people